Little Ness is a civil parish in Shropshire, England.  It contains eight listed buildings that are recorded in the National Heritage List for England.  Of these, one is listed at Grade I, the highest of the three grades, one is at Grade II*, the middle grade, and the others are at Grade II, the lowest grade. The parish contains the village of Little Ness, the smaller settlement of Milford, and the surrounding countryside.  The listed buildings consist of a church, houses and farmhouses that are basically timber framed, a country house and associated structures, and a war memorial.


Key

Buildings

References

Citations

Sources

Lists of buildings and structures in Shropshire